Calcaritermes is a genus of termites in the Kalotermitidae family.

Species
 Calcaritermes colei Krishna, 1962
 Calcaritermes nearcticus (Snyder, 1933)
 Calcaritermes parvinotus (Light, 1933)

References

Termite genera